The 1983 National Challenge Cup was the 70th edition of the USSF's annual open soccer championship. Teams from the North American Soccer League declined to participate.  New York Pancyprian-Freedoms defeated St. Louis Kutis SC in the final game. The score was 4–3.

It would be the final time in the 20th century that a club would consecutively win the National Cup. The next time it would happen was when the Seattle Sounders FC won the 2010 title.

References

External links
 1983 National Challenge Cup – TheCup.us

Nat
U.S. Open Cup